Carter Arey (born 1989) is an American wheelchair basketball player.

Background
Carter Arey was born in Columbia, Missouri. Arey attended Rock Bridge High School in Columbia and eventually attended the University of Missouri. Prior to enrollment at the University of Missouri, Arey snuck into the university's recreation center with a friend's ID. While there, Arey was approached by the head coach of the wheelchair basketball team and transferred school to play for the team the following fall semester.

College career
Arey played five seasons for the University of Missouri and earned All-American honors three times (2013–2015). Arey earned "Player of the Year" in 2014 under head coach Ronald Lykins.

Team USA career
Arey has made the final roster for Team USA in 2013, 2014 and 2015. He was a member of the team that won the silver medal at the 2014 Incheon World Wheelchair Basketball Championship, losing to Australia in the finals.

Personal Life 
Arey currently resides in Columbia, Missouri with his wife and two children.

References

External links
 http://www.stltoday.com/sports/college/mizzou/u-s-wheelchair-basketball-team-has-deep-mizzou-roots/article_35c27962-101b-5599-950b-4bdbeaecdbe5.html
 http://www.columbiatribune.com/sports/mu_basketball/california-chrome-owner-says-arey-would-beat-him-in-hoops/article_83b9529e-f0c9-11e3-94eb-10604b9ffe60.html

1989 births
Living people
American men's wheelchair basketball players
Sportspeople from Columbia, Missouri
Rock Bridge High School alumni
University of Missouri alumni
21st-century American people